Chris Kwakpovwe (born 15 November 1961) is a Christian minister, trained pharmacist and author. He is the founder and senior pastor of Manna Prayer Mountain (MPM) Ministry Worldwide, headquartered in Lagos. He is also the author of Our Daily Manna, a daily devotional.

Early life and education
Chris Kwakpovwe was born to the family of Stephen Kasoro Kwakpovwe, a retired teacher from Ughelli, Delta State, and Theresa Kwakpovwe. He had his childhood and primary education in Ughelli. He proceeded to Government College, Ughelli, Delta State, for his high school education. In 1978, he gained admission to the then University of Ife (now Obafemi Awolowo University) to study pharmacy and bagged his first degree in 1983. In 1999, he obtained his PhD in theology. He was awarded an honorary doctorate degree in theology by the Calvary Academy in collaboration with the Lighthouse Christian University, Brooklyn

Pastoral ministry
Chris Kwakpovwe went into full gospel ministry in 1992, after a stint in pharmacy and preaching for nine years. He served as an assisting founding pastor of the Chapel of Praise Church. Chris Kwakpovwe became a Christian writer when he started authoring and publishing Our Daily Manna with readership in several countries in Africa and beyond. On 7 July 2013, he was ordained as Bishop by the United Pentecostal College of Bishops USA/Nigeria. He oversees an annual religious programme tagged World Anointing Night which was "streamed live in more than 200 countries" in February 2018.

Kpakpovwe has a welfare ministry called Mercy Week, an annual two-day medical outreach through which he provides succour to "hundreds of the less privileged" with different medical conditions with a medical team consisting of "Shell Nigeria Exploration and Production Company alongside volunteers from University of Lagos and Lagos State University Colleges of Medicine, Pharmacy Schools and the Lagos State Ministry of Health." According to media reports, the medical outreach programme "took place simultaneously in other 100 countries and locations where the ministry has branches." He is also President and Founder of the Dream Centre (Nigeria), an initiative with a "vision for widows, widowers, the emotionally bruised, divorces, drug addicts, ex-convicts, the sick and such alike."

He worked with Christian bodies such as: Scripture Union, The Nigerian Fellowship of Evangelical Students (NIFES), The Christian Association of Nigeria, (CAN) and the Pentecostal Fellowship of Nigeria (PFN) of which he was once a zonal vice-president. He was ex-president of the Nigerian Christian Corpers Fellowship (NCCF).

Published works
Kwakpovwe has written, authored and published "over 70 books", including motivational Christian books, mini-books and devotionals, which include the following:
 War Against Haman
 My Womb Must Open By Fire 
 A Seven Day Prayer Plan On There Shall Be No Loss: Turning Loss to Gloss and taking back your Crown!
 A 3-Day Prayer Plan On Releasing Power To Change Your Situation - Virtue Secrets
 Blasting Down Your Wall of Jericho
 A Seven Day Prayer Plan On Wasting The Wasters of Your Destiny
 An 8 Day Prayer Plan on Provoking God to Remember You in the Midst of the Multitude

Awards and honours
Kwakpovwe was profiled as one of "100 Most Influential African Pastors" by Pleasures Magazine. He is a recipient of awards such as:
 Meritorious Service Award 2015 by Global Liberation Outreach
 Ambassador Of Pharmacy Award 2007 By The Nigerian Association Of Industrial Pharmacists
 Award of Excellence 2011 by Christian Association of Nigeria (CAN)
 Award Of Recognition By The Bible Society Of Nigeria 2014
 Honourable Life Award By Honour And Care International Fellows 2014

References

External links

	

Living people
Nigerian Christian writers
Nigerian company founders
1961 births